Loretta J. Mester (born October 24, 1958) is president and CEO of the Federal Reserve Bank of Cleveland.

Personal life
Mester was born in Baltimore, Maryland on October 24, 1958.  She is married to George Mailath, an economist at the University of Pennsylvania.

Education
Mester has a Bachelor of Arts degree from Barnard College, Columbia University in Mathematics and Economics and a Masters and Ph.D. in Economics from Princeton University. She was also a National Science Foundation Fellow at Princeton.

Career
Mester worked at the Federal Reserve Bank of Philadelphia, where she was executive vice president, director of research and chief policy advisor. She began work with the Federal Reserve Bank (in Philadelphia) in 1985 as an economist, thereafter being promoted to senior vice president, director of research, executive vice president. Mester has taught in both the MBA and BA business courses at Wharton and the Ph.D. finance course at New York University.

Mester became the president and CEO of the Federal Reserve Bank of Cleveland on June 1, 2014.  She was the 11th president and CEO of Cleveland’s Fourth District Federal Reserve Bank.

Mester is an adjunct professor of finance at the Wharton School of the University of Pennsylvania and a fellow at the Wharton Financial Institutions Center. Other positions Mester holds include: director of both the Greater Cleveland Partnership and of the Council for Economic Education, trustee of both the Cleveland Clinic and the Musical Arts Association (the Cleveland Orchestra), founding director of the Financial Intermediation Research Society, member of the advisory board of the Financial Intermediation Network of European Studies (FINEST).  Her professional memberships include the American Economic Association, the American Finance Association, the Econometric Society, and the Financial Management Association International.

Publications
Mester has published articles in various journals on the subjects of central banking, economics and finance.  She is co-editor of the Journal of Financial Services Research and the International Journal of Central Banking. She is an associate editor of: the Journal of Financial Intermediation; Journal of Money, Credit, and Banking; Journal of Economics and Business; Research in Banking and Finance; and Journal of Financial Stability.

Philanthropy
Mester is a director of the Greater Cleveland Partnership, a director of the Council for Economic Education, a trustee of the Cleveland Clinic, a trustee of the Musical Arts Association (Cleveland Orchestra), a founding director of the Financial Intermediation Research Society, and a member of the advisory board of the Financial Intermediation Network of European Studies (FINEST).

References

1958 births
21st-century American economists
21st-century American women
American bankers
American women bankers
American women economists
Barnard College alumni
Businesspeople from Baltimore
Economists from Maryland
Economists from Ohio
Federal Reserve Bank of Cleveland presidents
Living people
Princeton University alumni